HMS Viper was a six-gun  built for the Royal Navy during the 1830s. She was sold for scrap in 1851.

Description
The ship's tonnage was 181 35/94 tons burthen. The Cockatrice class was armed with two 6-pounder cannon and four 12-pounder carronades. The ships had a crew of 33–42 officers and ratings.

Construction and career
Viper, the twelfth ship of her name to serve in the Royal Navy, was ordered on 11 September 1828, laid down in June 1820 at Pembroke Dockyard, Wales, and launched on 12 May 1831. She was completed on 31 August 1831 at Plymouth Dockyard.

Notes

References

Cockatrice-class schooners
1831 ships
Ships built in Pembroke Dock